The Game Cock was a clipper ship known for its long sailing life of 29 years and 2 months. Its principal route was the New York to San Francisco run.

Construction
A game cock with neck extended served as the ship's figurehead. Game Cock was considered either a medium or extreme clipper. Its materials were similar to the Surprise.

Voyages
Game Cock sailed between New York City and San Francisco. The ship put in for repairs in Rio de Janeiro in 1851, and made voyages to Bombay in 1851, and Batavia in 1859.

References

External links
 American clipper ship Game Cock, Hansen, J., artist and lithographer Nagel & Weingaertner (1849–1857), printer
 Game Cock at Whampoa, painting by Gordon Grant (1875–1962)
 Lithograph of clipper Game Cock
 

Clippers
Individual sailing vessels
Ships built in Boston
1850 ships
Age of Sail merchant ships of the United States